The John W. Anderson House is a house located in Houston, Texas listed on the National Register of Historic Places. Built in 1907, the house is classified as a Queen Anne style cottage.

See also
 National Register of Historic Places listings in Harris County, Texas

References

National Register of Historic Places in Houston
Houses on the National Register of Historic Places in Texas
1907 establishments in Texas
Houses completed in 1907
Houses in Houston